Tom Clancy's The Division 2 is an online-only action role-playing video game developed by Massive Entertainment and published by Ubisoft. The sequel to Tom Clancy's The Division (2016), it is set in a near-future Washington, D.C., in the aftermath of a genetically engineered virus known as "Green Poison" being released, and follows an agent of the Strategic Homeland Division as they try to rebuild the city. The game was released for PlayStation 4, Windows, and Xbox One on March 15, 2019. 

It received generally favorable reviews from critics, with most noting it as an improvement over the first installment for its setting, gameplay, visuals, combat and soundtrack, though the Endgame content polarised critics. Like its predecessor, it was a commercial success, selling over 10 million copies worldwide despite not meeting expectations at launch.

Tom Clancy's The Division Heartland, a spin-off, is in development.

Gameplay

Played from a third-person perspective, the game is a cover-based third-person shooter with up to four players being able to complete missions together. The game takes place in Washington, D.C., seven months after its predecessor, in which a civil war between survivors and villainous bands of marauders breaks out. In the beginning of the game, players create their own Division agent by customizing the character's gender and appearance. In the game, players are equipped with different firearms, including assault rifles, sniper rifles and Submachine guns, and explosives like grenades to defeat enemies. These weapons are classified into different tiers and rarity. High-quality guns are difficult to obtain, but they have better weapon stats and "talents" that further help boost players' performance. The weapon stats include the following 7 domains: Damage, Rounds Per Minute, Magazine Size, Accuracy, Stability, Reload Time, and Damage Drop Off. These weapons can be further customized with different attachments like firearm optics, iron sights and barrel attachments. The game features a variety of gear and armor. Wearing gear from the same brand gives players a small performance boost. As players complete missions, they gain loot and experience points (XP). With sufficient XP, they level up and gain SHD Tech, a currency to unlock new skills. These skills include deploying gun turrets, shields and combat drones, or gaining access to weapons like seeker mines and chem launchers. Each skill has unique mods that change its functionality. The game introduces new enemy types, including healers and characters that shoot foam at players. Players can request backup during missions, which allows other players to join their sessions. Players can join a clan, which can accommodate up to 50 players. The actions of individual members of a clan contribute to clan XP, which can be used to upgrade the clan for additional gameplay benefits.

Washington, D.C., is an open world for players to explore. Players can recruit non-playable characters by completing missions and providing supplies to different settlements. Recruiting them unlocks new features, including projects, which are fetch quests that reward players with gear, XP, and blueprints for crafting, which can be accessed in the base of operation, the White House. Upgrading settlements enables their expansion to include more facilities and gives players gameplay benefits such as access to their gear stash or fast travel. Another way to fast travel is to use the safehouses players have discovered. Discovering a safehouse reveals the location of nearby SHD caches, which can be used to unlock new perks that further enhance players' combat performance as well as granting advantages such as XP bonuses. Players can liberate enemies' control points and call civilian reinforcements to assist in battle, participate in world events such as stopping public executions and capturing resource convoys, and searching for different collectibles including comms, relics and artifacts, and Echoes. Players encounter different weapon vendors, which buy trinkets (unusable "junk" items that players collect), and unwanted gear in exchange for E-credits, the game's currency, which can used to purchase new weapons, crafting and appearances changes.

The Division 2 features three Dark Zones, each of which supports up to 12 players. Dark Zones are areas in which players defeat tough enemies for valuable and rare loot, though the loot can be taken by other players. Upon entering a Dark Zone, players' gear become normalized to ensure that all players are in a level playing field. Non-contaminated loot belongs to players once collected, but contaminated loot must first be extracted by a helicopter while players defend the extraction point from AI enemies and other players. When one player breaks into a Dark Zone chest or steals a Dark Zone supply drop, the player and their team will become rogue. Rogue players can attack other players in the same session to steal their loot and gain XP. Once they eliminate another player, they become "disavowed," which alerts other non-rogue players. If the disavowed rogue eliminates more players, they're designated a "Manhunt Rogue"; players who kill the rogue agent will receive a significant bounty. Rogue status can be removed by surviving in the Dark Zone for a period of time or accessing the Thieves' Dens (for rogues) and Manhunt terminals (for Manhunt rogues). The Dark Zone has its own progression system, DZ XP, which are earned by killing enemies and rogues, and can be used to unlock perks and gameplay advantages such as a reduced rogue timer.

When a player reaches level 30 and finishes the game's campaign, the game-world is divided into "world tiers," which serve as different chapters and thresholds for further increasing the game's difficulty. Levels are replaced by Gear Score, which is calculated based on the stats, attributes, and talents of all the weapons and armor players have. In the endgame, a new enemy faction named the Black Tusk invades DC via a large hovercraft, and randomly selects three previously completed missions or strongholds as operational targets, which reactivate as "invaded" locations., which feature tougher enemies and correspondingly better loot. By completing Invaded missions and having sufficient Gear Score, players can liberate a stronghold, which then unlocks the next world tier. Players can encounter 52 bosses, collectively known as the Deck of 52; each boss will drop a collectible card for players to collect once they are defeated. When players reach the endgame, they can unlock more skills by specializing their character to a specific class: the Sharpshooter, the Demolitionist, and the Survivalist. Each specialization has its own signature weapon; a Survivalist with a crossbow, a Sharpshooter with a TAC-50 anti-materiel sniper rifle and a Demolitionist with a M32A1 grenade launcher. Players can enter Occupied Dark Zones, in which weapons are no longer normalized, friendly fire is activated, AI enemies become more difficult to kill, and players are no longer notified when other players turn rogue. The game features raids, which can be completed by up to eight players.

Synopsis

Setting 
The Division 2 is set after the events of Tom Clancy's The Division, in a world devastated by Green Poison, a potent smallpox strain engineered and released in New York City by an environmental terrorist. Green Poison became a pandemic, resulting in casualties and chaos on a global scale. Facing imminent social collapse, the United States government activated a contingent of domestic sleeper agents called the Strategic Homeland Division (SHD), or "The Division," to preserve order and continuity of government. Division agents leverage advanced technology and wide autonomy to deal with threats as they see fit. They are supplemented on the field with a network connection to Intelligent System Analytic Computer (ISAC), an advanced A.I. system.

By the beginning of The Division 2, most government and military personnel have evacuated Washington, D.C., which has descended into lawlessness. The White House is controlled by local Division agents and a coalition of first responders and National Guard troops called the Joint Task Force (JTF), working to protect civilians and reestablish order. However, most of Washington, D.C., has been carved into territories controlled by three competing factions: the Hyenas, a loose coalition of gangs, criminals, and anarchists taking advantage of the chaos for amusement and profit; the Outcasts, fanatical survivors of severe quarantines during the onset of the pandemic, seeking revenge on those they believe responsible for their imprisonment and eventual infection; and the True Sons, a highly organized and ruthless group of disgruntled JTF, U.S. Armed Forces, and paramilitary mutineers led by Colonel Antwon Ridgeway, who believes that security can only be restored through brutal authoritarianism.

Additionally, the Acting President of the United States, Andrew Ellis, is considered missing or killed in action since Air Force One crash landed near Capitol Hill.

Plot 
Seven months after the Green Poison outbreak, several Division agents are defending a civilian settlement from a bandit attack when ISAC, the system controlling their advanced technology and nationwide communications, suddenly shuts down. The Player's Agent receives a Division distress call from Washington, D.C., as a new and larger force begins to attack the settlement. At a fellow agent's urging, they abandon the battle to respond to the call. The Agent arrives in Washington, D.C., to find the Division and JTF's local base of operations, the White House, under attack by the Hyenas. After repelling the attack, the Agent is briefed by Manny Ortega, the city's Division controller. The Agent learns that most of the country's leadership is either dead or missing and the city is mostly controlled by three hostile factions: the Hyenas, the Outcasts, and the True Sons. Ortega instructs the Agent to work with fellow agent Alani Kelso to assist civilian settlements, liberate the city, and restore the SHD network.

Ortega and Kelso uncover information that a cure to Green Poison might be located somewhere in the city, and that President Ellis may have survived the crash of Air Force One but is being held prisoner. Kelso is reluctant to waste time and resources to find Ellis, but Ortega points out that his security clearance may be needed to access the cure. The Agent eventually discovers Ellis and rescues him from Hyena custody. Ellis confirms that broad spectrum antivirals to cure not just Green Poison, but all viral infections, exist. However he can only access them with a special briefcase currently held in the True Sons' heavily fortified base at the United States Capitol. After the Agent repairs the SHD Network, reconnecting Division agents across the country, Ellis vows to restore the United States, no matter the cost. With the tide turning against them, the Hyenas, True Sons, and Outcasts retreat to their final strongholds. With the help of civilian militias and the JTF, the Agent assaults the strongholds and eliminates the leadership of most of the factions, with the Outcasts' leader Emeline Shaw disappearing during the assault on her stronghold on Roosevelt Island, while recovering Ellis' briefcase from the Capital.

As the Agent and the Division celebrate their victory, a new faction, the technologically advanced private military company Black Tusk, invades the city. Many of D.C.'s landmarks are quickly seized and Ellis suddenly goes missing with his briefcase, forcing the Agent to head out to find Ellis and repel the Black Tusk. The Agent eventually learns that Black Tusk supplied weapons to the gangs of D.C. and were responsible for sabotaging the SHD network, Ellis has been working with the Black Tusk all along, and that Ellis' predecessor, President Mendez, did not commit suicide as previously believed, but was assassinated by his own Secret Service detail on Black Tusk's orders. Thanks to Ellis, Black Tusk gains possession of the broad spectrum antivirals, planning to transport them out of the city. The Agent successfully raids Black Tusk's stronghold at Tidal Basin, retrieving the antivirals and preventing a missile strike on the White House, although Ellis' location remains unknown.

Downloadable content

Episode 1 – D.C. Outskirts: Expedition 
Further investigation reveals that Outcast leader Emeline Shaw survived the Division's assault at the stronghold, and that she is at her new hideout at the Manning National Zoo. After fighting their way through the Zoo, the Agent manages to destroy Shaw's heavily armed monorail car and kill her.

The Agent joins a large JTF task force in an attack on Camp White Oaks, a heavily wooded former presidential retreat in Maryland, which has since been taken over by Black Tusk, with the objective of locating and capturing President Ellis. The main assault force is annihilated when the bridge they are crossing is destroyed by Black Tusk and the remaining team is eventually overrun while trying to secure the main helipad to prevent Ellis' escape, leaving the Agent to continue the mission alone. The Agent manages to reach the helipad too late as Ellis is evacuated by Black Tusk helicopter, disappearing for the second time.

Meanwhile, the Agent is sent on an expedition to Kenly College to investigate the recent disappearance of a JTF Squad, where the Outcasts have taken over the campus and severed communications.  There, the Agent removes the Outcasts securing stolen supplies at the College Library, infiltrates the Metro Station and water treatment facility underneath, and destroys the outcast base in the Student Union building.

Episode 2 – Pentagon: The Last Castle
The Agent is sent to investigate the Pentagon after the Division detects heavy Black Tusk activity at the facility. Upon reaching the site, the Agent discovers that Black Tusk is setting up a massive drilling operation in order to access the DARPA laboratories underneath the Pentagon, which hold numerous experimental technologies. The Agent sabotages the drilling operation to delay Black Tusk before stealing data from their servers to figure out what they are after. It is revealed that Black Tusk are after a perfusion bioreactor, capable of mass producing the antivirals the Division possesses.

The Agent proceeds into the DARPA lab to find Black Tusk attempting to smuggle the bioreactor out through the tunnel network beneath the Pentagon. The Agent is able to seize the bioreactor and transport it to a nearby helipad, eliminating Black Tusk forces so that the bioreactor can be extracted. Kelso congratulates the Agent, stating that even though they do not have staff qualified to operate the bioreactor yet, they are one step closer to ending the threat of Green Poison.

Episode 3 – Coney Island: The Hunt 
The Agent is sent to the ruins of Coney Island to rescue Vitaly Tchernenko, a virologist kidnapped by rogue Division agent Aaron Keener during the events of the previous game. Keener intends to hand Tchernenko over to Black Tusk at Coney Island in exchange for assistance with an unknown project. The Agent is tasked with rescuing Tchernenko to ensure his knowledge does not fall into Black Tusk's hands, and enlist his help in creating a vaccine. The Agent successfully infiltrates Black Tusk's defenses and has Tchernenko evacuated to Washington, D.C.

It becomes apparent that Keener never intended to allow Black Tusk to leave with Tchernenko, as the island comes under attack by The Cleaners, a gang of deranged former DSNY workers that aims to violently purge any potential sources and carriers of the virus. Keener informed The Cleaners of Tchernenko's whereabouts, inciting them to attack Black Tusk so they can kill him. The Agent is forced to fight their way through the Cleaners and Black Tusk while hunting for Keener. After the Agent kills the Black Tusk's commander, Keener hijacks the video feed from a Division drone to gloat at the Agent about his successful double cross, escape, and ominous project.

Warlords of New York expansion 

The Agent and Alani Kelso travel to New York City, answering a distress call from Faye Lau, leader of local Division operations. They find the JTF and Division's base in City Hall devastated by a biological weapon deployed by Keener and his allies. The weapon is a derivative of Green Poison called Eclipse, engineered to be instantaneously lethal. The Agent, Kelso, Lau, and JTF leader Roy Benitez regroup at Haven, a civilian settlement run by Paul Rhodes. The settlement is under constant attack and harassment from The Cleaners and The Rikers, the latter being a group mainly consisting of former prisoners from Rikers Island, who now act as an organization who sells weapons and explosives on the black market.  Rhodes reluctantly allows The Division to use Haven as their temporary base as long as they leave as soon as they're finished.

As Keener's whereabouts are unknown, the group goes after his lieutenants, who act as warlords in four Lower Manhattan neighborhoods. Keener's warlords are fellow rogue agents convinced or coerced to work for him alongside local gangs: Theo Parnell, an engineering and computer expert fortified inside The Tombs of Civic Center; Vivian Conley, a chemical engineer commanding The Cleaners from a wrecked oil tanker in Two Bridges; Javier Kajika, a guerrilla warfare expert striking from the tunnels beneath Battery Park; and James Dragov, a heavy weapons expert leading The Rikers gang from the Stock Exchange in the Financial District.

The Agent eliminates the four warlords and recovers intelligence placing Keener on Liberty Island. The Agent and Kelso commandeer a ferry to Liberty Island, but are attacked by Black Tusk, who have arrived in Manhattan to attack Keener and confiscate his work. The Agent fights off Black Tusk to reach Keener inside the Statue of Liberty Museum, discovering a surface-to-surface missile system capable of delivering Eclipse payloads. Keener plans to launch a missile at Manhattan, killing everyone to enable the rise of a new society. The agent successfully destroys the system and defeats Keener in battle. A mortally wounded Keener activates a signal on his modified Division wristwatch before dying.

Keener's signal activates ANNA, an AI analogue to ISAC developed by Parnell to network and coordinate rogue Division agents across the country. It's also revealed that Lau betrayed the Division to ally with Black Tusk at some point, and was their reason for arriving in Manhattan after Keener's location was known. Lau tells Bardon Schaeffer, Black Tusk's leader in Washington, D.C., that Keener's rogue agent network will help them end the Division. Back in Haven, Rhodes and Benitez thank and congratulate the Agent, but lament Lau's betrayal. Kelso informs the Agent of a rogue agent cell activated in Washington, D.C.

Manhunt 
The first rogue cell that the Agent hunts down is led by Molly "Jupiter" Henderson, who teams up with the Cleaners to attack Washington, D.C., under Keener's orders.  The next rogue cell consists of Carter "Hornet" Leroux, an old friend of Keener's who is tasked with creating more of the Eclipse virus, he teams up with the Outcasts.  The third cell has The Division going after The Black Tusk commanding officer, Bardon Schaeffer.  During his manhunt, a mysterious Hunter appears as the Agent goes after Schaeffer's Rogue Agents.  The Agent eventually kills the hunter, then wounds and captures Schaeffer.

The fourth rogue agent cell is led by Faye Lau herself.  After killing her subordinates, the Agent goes after Lau who has set up a meeting with President Ellis.  However, just before they can get to them, Lau kills Ellis and attempts to flee.  The Agent then faces off against Lau and eventually kills her.  A series of audio logs reveal that she joined the Black Tusk in order to assassinate Ellis and overthrow the rest of the U.S. Government.

After Lau is killed, Kelso goes through her encrypted files, while the Agent goes to neutralize a new threat lead by the True Sons, who are under the new leadership of General Anderson and Captain Lewis.  After killing Lewis's lieutenants, the Agent then teams up with Lewis to take down a Black Tusk force, where Kelso eventually decrypts Lau's files.  It is then revealed that Lau and Schaeffer both betrayed The Black Tusk and attempted to warn the Division of an even bigger threat, which is headed by Black Tusk founder Natalya Sokolova, and Calvin McManus, the Secretary of Homeland Security.  Lewis then meets with Ortega, warning that Anderson has allied himself and the True Sons with Black Tusk and that he and a group of defectors wish to join alongside The Division.  After killing 4 more Black Tusk officers sent to secure the alliance, Anderson captures Lewis and the Agent is sent to a nuclear power plant to rescue him.  The mission is successful, but Anderson escapes with the Black Tusk.

Development 
The game was developed by Massive Entertainment. Evaluating the feedback from players regarding the first game, Massive Entertainment planned to include more game content at launch and improve the endgame. The game's endgame development was prioritized by Massive Entertainment after hearing players' complaints from the first game. The developers have said that the game's main campaign will take around 40 hours to beat, making it twice as long as the original game.

The game was announced on March 9, 2018, by Ubisoft, with the first gameplay footage being premiered at the Electronic Entertainment Expo 2018 in June 2018. At the Expo, Ubisoft confirmed that the game will be released on March 15, 2019, for PlayStation 4, Windows, and Xbox One. A private beta was launched prior to the game's release. The beta started on February 7, 2019, and ended four days later on February 11. After the game's release, three episodes of downloadable content, which add new story content and gameplay modes, will be released for all players for free.

To set The Division 2 apart from the first game in the series, Massive Entertainment and Ubisoft spent part of the development process revamping the game's weapons based on player feedback. The development team also spent a great deal of time reworking the game's mod system, alongside class specializations. In an interview, director Mathias Karlson said that the development team wanted "Washington to feel as realistic as possible," and that architectural accuracy, as well as realistic weapon sounds, played a large role in that. He said that the team hired and used a number of professional military advisors to help them recreate Washington, D.C., and key sections of the game.

An expansion, Warlords of New York, was announced by Ubisoft on February 11, 2020, with a release date of March 3, 2020. Warlords of New York features new story and exploration activities in the ruins of Lower Manhattan. The narrative focus of the expansion is the Agent's hunt for rogue Division agent Aaron Keener, after the Episode 3 downloadable content.

The game, including all expansions to date, launched on Stadia on March 17, 2020. The Stadia version shares cross-platform play with Microsoft Windows users along with shared progression between those platforms. The game was also released for Amazon Luna on November 23, 2020.

Ubisoft released a new game mode named "The Summit" on September 22, 2020. In this mode, up to four players work as a team and ascend a 100-story skyscraper, combating increasingly difficult enemy forces.

On January 21, 2021, Capcom announced that they were working with Ubisoft on a The Division 2 collaboration with the Resident Evil series, which consists of Leon's RPD uniform from the Resident Evil 2 remake, S.T.A.R.S. uniforms used by Jill Valentine, Chris Redfield and Rebecca Chambers, and HUNK's U.S.S. uniform. Leon's Resident Evil 4 jacket and Claire's Resident Evil 2 clothes are also available. The event is available to gamers who completed the Warlords of New York event.

On February 2, 2021, Ubisoft released an update that would allow the PlayStation 5 and Xbox Series X/S to run the game at 60 frames per second while maintaining a 4K resolution.

Reception 

Tom Clancy's The Division 2 received "generally favorable reviews" from critics, according to review aggregator Metacritic.

Destructoid praised the game for its tight, satisfying gameplay, summarizing its review with: "Impressive effort with a few noticeable problems holding it back. Won't astound everyone, but is worth your time and cash." In its 9/10 review, Game Informer wrote that "Thrilling combat, a great loot loop, and a strong endgame elevate this Tom Clancy shooter to new heights."

PC Gamer gave it a score of 82/100, calling it a "packed, rewarding, and frequently thrilling looter shooter that should have a bright future." In its 4.5/5 review, GamesRadar+ wrote: "The Division 2 is a seriously accomplished looter-shooter, with a gameplay loop that keeps on giving, and an endgame that will keep you playing for months (or years) to come." GameSpot praised the world design, reward system and variation of enemies, giving the game a 9/10. IGN gave the game a rating of 8.5/10. They praised the "wonderful recreation of Washington, D.C." and were impressed by the gunplay and loot systems which were well thought out and offered player choice. Although the endgame was thought "disappointing", this was considered likely a "temporary problem" and overall the game was said to be "one of the strongest launches the genre has seen yet."

Sales
The Division 2 was the UK's best-selling game the week it was released, although its sales figures were 20% of the original game's launch-week sales. In Japan, approximately 63,817 physical units for PlayStation 4 were sold during its launch week becoming the number one selling game of any format. The game topped the PS4 download charts.

The game's sales on consoles failed to meet Ubisoft's expectations, with Ubisoft citing increased competition in the genre as a factor leading to the game's disappointing performance. Ubisoft added that the sales on PC were similar to that of the first game.  The game sold more than 10 million copies during the eighth generation of video game consoles.

It was revealed during testimony in the Epic Games v. Apple antitrust lawsuit that, between 9–11 May, 70–90% of the online transactions for the game's download were fraudulent, as scammers were using stolen credit card numbers to buy Ubisoft games in the Epic Games Store, which prompted a "profuse" email apology from Epic CEO Tim Sweeny to Ubisoft CEO Yves Guillemot. "Fraud rates for other Epic games store titles are under 2% and Fortnite is under 1%. So 70% fraud was an extraordinary situation."

Awards

Future
Tom Clancy's The Division Heartland, a free-to-play spin-off, has been under development since 2020.

Tom Clancy's The Division Resurgence, a free-to-play game for Android and iOS will be released in the future.

Notes

References

External links
 

2019 video games
Bioterrorism in fiction
Fiction about diseases and disorders
Dystopian video games
Massive Entertainment games
Multiplayer video games
Open-world video games
PlayStation 4 games
PlayStation 4 Pro enhanced games
Stadia games
Third-person shooters
Tom Clancy games
Ubisoft games
Video game sequels
Video games about viral outbreaks
Video games developed in Sweden
Video games set in the future
Video games set in Maryland
Video games set in New York City
Video games set in Washington, D.C.
Video games set in Virginia
Video games with cross-platform play
Windows games
Xbox One games
Loot shooters